The following lists events that happened in 2012 in Libya.

Incumbents
Prime Minister: Ali Zeidan

 
Years of the 21st century in Libya
Libya
Libya
2010s in Libya